Lorenzochloa is a monotypic genus of perennial plants in the grass family. The only known species is Lorenzochloa erectifolia  They are native to South America. It was formerly placed in the Ortachne genus, as Ortachne erectifolia, until phylogenetic analysis.

They are found in Colombia, Costa Rica, Ecuador, Peru and Venezuela.

The genus name of Lorenzochloa is in honour of Lorenzo Raimundo Parodi (1895–1966), who was an Argentinian botanist and agricultural engineer, professor of botany in Buenos Aires and La Plata with a focus on South American grasses.

The genus was circumscribed in Bol. Soc. Argent. Bot. vol.11 on page 239 in 1969.

References

External links

Pooideae
Monotypic Poaceae genera
Grasses of South America
Flora of western South America